The Dutch Association of Publishers categorizes the magazines in the Netherlands into four classes: (1) general-interest magazines, (2) opinion magazines, (3) TV and radio guides, and (4) professional and scientific magazines. The listing here is topical, without making a value judgment if, for example, a music magazine is professional or not.

Car and motorcycle

 Auto Review
 Autovisie 
 Autoweek (since 1958)
 Carros
 Formule1.nl
 De Kampeerauto
 Mercedes magazine
 Moto 73
 Motor
 Porsche Scene Live
 Promotor
 Top Gear (Dutch version)
 Truckstar

Career
 Intermediair (?–2012; now webzine)

Children and young adults

 Betsalel (1928-1935), defunct Dutch Jewish youth magazine
 Donald Duck (since 1952)
 Eppo (1975–1999; since 2009)
 Mad (1965–1995; 2011–2012)
 Tina (since 1967)

Families

 AllesVoor
 ANBO Magazine
Kampioen (since 1885), distributed to members of the Royal Dutch Touring Club
 Navenant
 Party
 Plus
 Privé (since 1977), gossip weekly
 Story (since 1974), gossip weekly
 Terdege
 Weekend (since 1975), gossip weekly
 Zin

Film
 De Filmkrant (since 1981)
Skrien (1968–2009; 2010–2011)

Food

 Allerhande (since 1954), free magazine of Albert Heijn
 Boodschappen, monthly
 Chateau (1993–1996)
 Delicious
 Elle Eten (since 1998)
 Foodies
 Jamie Magazine
 Koken & Genieten
 La Cucina Italiana
 Menu Magazine (1992–1996)
 Tip Culinair (1992–2004)

Inflight
 Holland Herald

Literature
Boekzaal der Geleerde Wereld (1715–1811)
Hollands Maandblad (weekly Hollands Weekblad, 1959–1963; monthly since 1963)
Maatstaf (1953–1999)
 De Nieuwe Gids

Men
 Fantastic Man
Nieuwe Revu (since 1968)
 Panorama (since 1913)
 Playboy (Dutch version since 1983)

Music
 Akkoord Magazine (since 1993)
 Heaven Magazine
 Hitkrant (since 1977)
 Luister (since 1952)
 Mens en Melodie (1946–2012)
 Oor (since 1971)

News and opinion

Elsevier (since 1945), right-wing
De Groene Amsterdammer (since 1877), left-wing
HP/De Tijd (De Tijd daily newspaper 1845–1974, weekly opinion magazine 1974–1990; Haagse Post weekly 1914–1990; combined since 1990; monthly since 2012), right-wing
 Maarten! (since 2008)
 Nieuw Israëlietisch Weekblad (since 1865)
 Nieuwe Revu
 Opinio
 De Post van den Neder-Rhijn (1781–1787; De nieuwe post van den Neder-Rhijn 1795–1799)
Vrij Nederland (since 1940), left-wing

Quackery and New Age
 A. Vogel's Gezondheidsnieuws (1963–2004)
Bres (1965–2006)
 Leef met Elixer (Leef 1979–1983, Elixer 1980–1983, combined 1983-1984)
Onkruid (since 1978)

Science and technology

 Chip (Dutch edition)
 Computer easy
 Computer Idee
 Computer!Totaal (since 1992)
 C'T Magazine v. Computertech
 Hoog Spel (1990-2000)
 iCreate
Kijk (since 1968)
 PC Magazine (had a Dutch printed version, years unknown)
 Personal Computer Magazine (since 1983)
 Power Unlimited (since 1993)
 Quest (since 2004)

Sports
1900, bimonthly (since 2012)
Ajax Magazine (1986–2007; continued online as Ajax iMagazine since 2011)
Ajax-nieuws (1917–1987)
 ELF Voetbal (since 1982), soccer monthly
Voetbal International (since 1965), soccer weekly
 Voetbal Magazine (since 1986), soccer monthly
 De Waterkampioen (since 1927), sailing and other surface water sports

Women

 Avenue (1965–1995; 2001)
 Beatrijs (1939–1967), a Catholic woman's weekly
 Beau Monde, Dutch glamour magazine
 Cosmopolitan, Dutch version of an American magazine
 Elle, Dutch version of a French magazine
 Esta (2004–2013)
 Grazia, Dutch version of an Italian magazine
 Jan
 Knipmode (Madeleine since ?, Knip since 1969, Knipmode since 199?)
Libelle  (since 1934)
Margriet (since 1938)
 Moeder (1934–1974), Catholic women's magazine
 Opzij (since 1972)
 Privé
 Viva (since 1972)
 Vriendin (since 1997)
 Vrouw

Public broadcaster magazines
 Televizier (since 1967)
 VPRO Gids (since 1974)
 VARA Gids (since 1928)
 TROSKompas (1964-2014)
 miKRO Gids (since 1988)
 Veronica Magazine (since 1974)
 NCRV Gids (since 19??)
 VPRO Achterwerk (1976-2016)
 TV Magazine (1988-2008)
 AVROBode (197?-2014)
 MijnKRO (since 2015)
 MijnNCRV (since 2015)
 EO Visie (since 1976)

See also
 Books in the Netherlands

References

External links
Sanoma verkoopt 19 tijdschriften

Dutch-language magazines
Netherlands
 
Magazines